George Neale Jr. House, also known as the Pence Building, is a historic home located at Parkersburg, Wood County, West Virginia.  Built in 1840, it is a two-story structure with a stone foundation and walls of handmade orange-red brick in the Greek Revival style. The house was converted into law and real estate offices in the 1880s. Additions to the original building were built in 1958 and 1973.

It was listed on the National Register of Historic Places in 1980.

References

Houses in Parkersburg, West Virginia
Houses on the National Register of Historic Places in West Virginia
Greek Revival houses in West Virginia
Houses completed in 1840
National Register of Historic Places in Wood County, West Virginia
Vernacular architecture in West Virginia